The 2022–23 Iowa Hawkeyes women's basketball team represents the University of Iowa during the 2022–23 NCAA Division I women's basketball season. The Hawkeyes are led by head coach Lisa Bluder in her twenty-third season, and play their home games at Carver–Hawkeye Arena as a member of the Big Ten Conference.

Previous season
The Hawkeyes finished the 2021–22 season with a 24–8 record, including 14–4 in Big Ten play. They won the 2022 Big Ten women's basketball tournament and earned the conference's automatic bid to the 2022 NCAA Division I Women's Basketball Tournament, where they advanced to the second round.

During the season, consensus All-American Caitlin Clark became the first woman ever to lead D-I in scoring and assists in the same season, and Monika Czinano led D-I in field-goal percentage. This made the Hawkeyes the first Division I men's or women's program to feature the national leaders in those three statistics in a single season.

Offseason

Departures

Roster

Schedule and results

|-
!colspan=9 style=| Exhibition

|-
!colspan=9 style=| Regular Season

|-
!colspan=6 style=|

|-
!colspan=6 style=|

Rankings

References

Iowa Hawkeyes women's basketball seasons
Iowa
Iowa
Iowa
Iowa